Douglas Charles Keene (30 August 1928 – 21 January 1986) was an English professional footballer who played as a wing half in the Football League for Brighton & Hove Albion, Colchester United and Brentford.

Personal life 
Keene served his National Service in the British Army.

Career statistics

References

1928 births
1986 deaths
English footballers
Colchester United F.C. players
Brentford F.C. players
Brighton & Hove Albion F.C. players
Dartford F.C. players
Footballers from Hendon
Kingsbury Town F.C. players
Association football wing halves
English Football League players
20th-century British Army personnel